Dream is a 2009 sculpture and a piece of public art by Jaume Plensa in Sutton, St Helens, Merseyside. Costing approximately £1.8m (equivalent to £ in ), it was funded through The Big Art Project in coordination with the Arts Council England, The Art Fund and Channel 4.

Origin
In 2008, St Helens took part in Channel 4's "The Big Art Project" along with several other sites. The project culminated in the unveiling of Dream, a  sculpture located on the old Sutton Manor Colliery site.

St Helens retains strong cultural ties to the coal industry and has several monuments including the wrought iron gates of Sutton Manor Colliery, as well as the 1995 town centre installation by Thompson Dagnall known as "The Landings" (depicting individuals working a coal seam) and Arthur Fleischmann's Anderton Shearer monument (a piece of machinery first used at the Ravenhead Mine).

The council and local residents (including approximately 15 former miners from the colliery) were involved in the consultation and commission process through which Dream was selected. The plans involved a full landscaping of the surrounding area on land previously allowed to go wild after the closure of the pit.

The sculpture
The structure is coated in sparkling white Spanish dolomite, as a contrast to the coal which used to be mined here. It cost nearly £1.9 million and it is hoped it will become as powerful a symbol in North West England as Antony Gormley's Angel of the North is in North East England.

Jaume Plensa himself stated "When I first came to the site I immediately thought something coming out of the earth was needed. I decided to do a head of a nine-year-old girl which is representing this idea of the future. It's unique."

The original design of the sculpture called for a skyward beam of light from the top of the head, and the sculpture's working title was Ex Terra Lucem ("From the ground, light"), a reference to St Helens' previous motto. Due to objections from the Highways Agency, the sculpture was not lit, but in 2010 a new planning application was submitted to St Helens Council for it to be floodlit.

Basic Info

 
· Designed by world-famous, award-winning Catalan artist Jaume Plensa

· Standing on a plinth, Dream is 20 metres, 66 feet high and is fifty times life size

· The sculpture weighs 373 tonnes and sits on the site of Sutton Manor Colliery

· Made from brilliant white pre-cast concrete with Spanish dolomite, the whitest marble

· The plinth in the shape of a miner's tally is 17 metres in diameter, made of 36 units

· The casting of Dream by Evans Concrete of Derbyshire took a total of sixty days

· A total of 6160 man hours were spent in constructing the sculpture

· 54 different panels each weighing 9 tonnes comprise Dream's head

· The supporting piles go 38 metres underground, nearly twice Dream's height

· An estimated 55 million vehicles pass Dream each year on the M62

Construction
The Dream sculpture is built out of moulded and cast unique concrete shapes, 90 pieces in all contributing to over 14 tiers (54 individual elements for the head, each weighing ). Dolomite was utilised as a concrete aggregate in order to provide the brilliant white finish. Additionally titanium dioxide was added to the mix in order to provide a self-cleaning mechanism. The construction required the construction of individual moulds for each piece and took a total of 60 days to cast.

The foundations of the sculpture extend  into the ground with 8 piles driven in to secure it.

Timeline

Work on Sutton Manor Colliery commenced in 1906. Local coal proprietor Richard Evans sank the No.1 shaft with a diameter of 18 feet. This was completed in December 1909 when the shaft was extended to a depth of 1,823 feet. The sinking of No.2 shaft at Sutton Manor began in July 1906 with a shaft diameter initially measuring 22 feet. This was completed in 1912 and extended to a depth of 2,343 feet, the equivalent of five Blackpool Towers. Coal production started at the colliery in 1910, reaching its peak in 1964 when the pit employed 1,400 people and was producing 1,500 tons of coal per week.

In 1983, the National Coal Board announced a £14 million investment in Sutton Manor that they predicted would provide a "kiss of life" for the "viable" pit, converting it into one of Britain's most modern collieries. A year-long strike commenced at the colliery in May 1984 as part of the UK miners' strike (1984–85).

Production continued until 1991, when British Coal announced that the pit was unviable and was scheduled for closure. They claimed that Sutton Manor Colliery had lost £23 million over the previous five years. The colliery closed with over forty years' worth of coal still underground.

In February 2001, the Forestry Commission leased the site from St Helens Council and after consulting with the local community, put 'Project Wasteland to Woodland' into operation. Starting in 2004, the heavily compacted soil was first prepared for tree planting and habitat creation, a procedure that took two months. After this, fifty thousand young trees including alder, willow and ash were planted. The experts at the Forestry Commission chose a mix of slow and fast-growing trees to cover the site.

In 2005, Sean Durney, the Arts Officer for St Helens Council, nominated the former Sutton Manor Colliery site for a new Channel 4 TV programme called The Big Art Project where various sites aimed to inspire and create unique works of public art across the UK. The site competed with other locations and community groups nationwide as part of this programme.

The St. Helens bid was supported by a former miners' focus group, formed in partnership with St Helens Council. The former pitmen were interested in the establishment of some form of memorial on the site. Former miner Gary Conley led this group of former Sutton Manor workers, who were tasked to work with an artist to commission an artwork backed by the local authority. Contributions from the council were made by John Whaling (Economic Development Manager who was also the Dream Project Manager) and Bob Hepworth (Director for Urban Regeneration & Housing).

At this point, the project was given a working title: Ex Terra Lucem, based on the former town motto of St Helens.

In January 2006, the council recruited Laurie Peake of Liverpool Biennial to act as curator for the project. Laurie had only recently commissioned Antony Gormley to produce his work on Crosby Beach entitled Another Place. Despite being shortlisted alongside eleven other bids, the St Helens initiative was initially not selected by the production company's expert panel as one of the final six that would feature in the series, losing out to communities in Burnley, Cardigan, the Isle of Mull, Newham in East London, North Belfast and Sheffield. However, in November of that year, The Big Art Project's governing body decided to review its decision on discarding St Helens and ultimately included the Sutton Manor site as a seventh location.

In February 2007, the former miners' steering group held a meeting to select an artist to work with, chaired by Laurie Peake. From a shortlist of twelve, the former miners unanimously selected renowned Catalan artist Jaume Plensa to submit a proposal, which he agreed to do. The former miners also agreed at this time against a literal monument to mining, instead favouring an installation that as well as referencing the past would be contemporary and forward-looking. Plensa first visited the Sutton Manor site in April 2007, meeting the former miners during the visit, before returning in August to present his first ideas for the site to the steering group. This initial proposal was described as a twenty metre tall monument in the shape of a miner's lamp, named The Miner's Soul. This was rejected by the former miners' group who requested something more present-day and progressive.

Plensa returned to St Helens in February 2008 with his new proposal, entitled Dream. The new design was well-received by the steering group, who give it their full backing. St Helens Council granted conditional planning permission for the structure in September of that year. In October, the contract to fabricate the installation's ninety panels of pre-cast concrete, to be conveyed in sections to the site in St Helens, was awarded to Evans Concrete of Derbyshire. Arup were appointed as lead project consultant alongside Cheetham Hill Construction as the lead contractor.

The topping-off ceremony took place in April 2009 as the final section of Dream was winched into place. The official opening ceremony was then held in May with over two thousand people in attendance, featuring a traditional Whit walk, brass bands, choirs, and Jaume Plensa as the guest of honour.

An article by Janet Street-Porter, highly critical about public art, was published in The Independent in April 2009. The columnist claimed that Dream would be one of the "follies of our age".

In July 2011, lights were installed at the base of the sculpture, intended to illuminate the elongated alabaster face, but these were vandalised within days. At the time, Helen Carter of the Guardian wrote: "There was a real sense of pride when it opened, particularly among the former miners. Whenever I've visited, it has always been busy with dog walkers and people who are there specifically to visit. I, too, hope they persevere with Dream."

St Helens Council stated that 24,000 people visited the site of Dream between February and May in 2011.

In August 2011, Melvyn Bragg visited Dream to interview Gary Conley for his three-part BBC Two series Class and Culture. Bragg describes Dream as "A cultural monument for a class".

In 2012, BBC's The One Show interviewed Gary Conley about Dream for a report on public art. Gary revealed that over 64,000 people had visited the Sutton Manor site in the past year alone.

Screenwriter Frank Cottrell-Boyce visits Dream for a BBC Radio 4 broadcast where he tells Gary Conley that he used Dream and the motto Ex Terra Lucem as inspiration for the 2012 Summer Olympics opening ceremony in London.

Gary Conley is featured in 2014 in both the Liverpool Echo and the St Helens Star, pictured in front of Dream on the 30-year anniversary of the beginning of the miners’ strike. Gary tells the media that Dream will represent the mining heritage in St Helens and will ensure that it will never be forgotten.

Stuart Maconie visited Dream in 2015 to record a programme for Radio 4 about northern men and the bonds between miners. Dream was chosen as the backdrop for the programme because of the area's transformation from Sutton Manor Colliery to the site which now homes the acclaimed artwork.  The recording went on to become Radio 4’s documentary of the month.

Dream was featured heavily in the Netflix crime drama series Stay Close, released on 31 December 2021.

Dream Awards 
The prestigious Marsh Sculpture Prize 2009, awarded to the UK's best sculpture of the year.

The Best Community Artwork at Royal Town Planning Institute (RTPI) North West Planning Achievement Award 2009.

The 2009 British Precast Concrete Federation Creativity in Concrete Award. Awarded to Jaume Plensa

The Ambassador Of St Helens 2009 awarded to Gary Conley for his work on and promotion of Dream

The 2010 Civic Trust Award

The 2010 Civic Trust Special Award for Community Engagement

The 2010 Places of Interest Quality Assurance Scheme (PIQAS) accreditation and chosen as the venue for the national launch

The 2010 Visit England Northwest Tourism Award for Public Space, presented to the former miners for their work on Dream.

The 2010 Merseyside Civic Society Best Open Space Award

The 2010 Merseyside Civic Society Civic Pride Award (voted for by the public)

References

External links
 http://dreamsthelens.com/
 https://suttonbeauty.org.uk/dreamsthelens/dreamstorypictures/
 https://suttonbeauty.org.uk/beauty/dreamsthelens/
 https://suttonbeauty.org.uk/beauty/dreamsthelens/dreammedia/
 https://suttonbeauty.org.uk/suttonhistory/suttonmanorcolliery1/
 https://suttonbeauty.org.uk/suttonhistory/suttonmanorcolliery2/
 https://www.youtube.com/results?search_query=dream+st+helens

2009 sculptures
Public art in England
Tourist attractions in Merseyside
St Helens, Merseyside
Sculptures by Jaume Plensa
Colossal statues in the United Kingdom